Tatiana Chişca (born July 19, 1995 in Bălți) is a Moldovan swimmer, who specialized in breaststroke events. Chisca qualified for the women's 100 m breaststroke at the 2012 Summer Olympics in London by breaking a Moldovan record and eclipsing a FINA B-standard entry time of 1:10.68 from the Ukrainian Championships in Dnipropetrovsk. She challenged seven other swimmers on the second heat, including two-time Olympian Danielle Beaubrun of St. Lucia. Chisca rounded out the field to last place by more than two seconds behind Chinese Taipei's Chen I-Chuan in 1:13.30. Chisca failed to advance into the semifinals, as she placed fortieth overall in the preliminaries.

References

External links
NBC Olympics Profile

1995 births
Living people
Moldovan female breaststroke swimmers
Swimmers at the 2012 Summer Olympics
Swimmers at the 2016 Summer Olympics
Olympic swimmers of Moldova
Sportspeople from Bălți